Olympic is a station on the  of Hong Kong's MTR. The livery is dodger blue.

The station was originally named Tai Kok Tsui in proposals outlined by the government in the Airport Core Programme during the 1990s. In 1996, however, when Lee Lai-shan won the first ever Olympic gold medal of Hong Kong in windsurfing at the Atlanta 1996 Summer Olympics and two Hong Kong sportsmen, Cheung Yiu-cheung and Chiu Chung-lun, also won Gold medals in the Paralympic Games of the same year, the (then-under construction) station was renamed Olympic on 16 December 1996, paying tribute to those achievements of Hong Kong athletes. The station is decorated with the pictures of the 1996 Summer Olympics and is named after the Olympic Games.

Olympic is only one of two stations on the Tung Chung line not shared with another line, the other being . 



History 
On 22 June 1998, Olympic station opened in sync with Tung Chung line.

Station layout 
Both side platforms are parallel to each other and are at ground level. They do not share the same island platform due to the Airport Express trains running through the station, between the two platforms, without stopping.

Entrances and exits 

All exits are reached by pedestrian footbridges extending in different directions from the concourse, which is built in a rectangular box between West Kowloon Highway and Lin Cheung Road.

A1: Island Harbourview Bus Terminus
A2: Island Harbourview, Olympian City 1 
B: HSBC Centre Towers 2 and 3
C1: Sham Mong Road 
C2: Cherry Street
C3: HSBC Centre Towers 2 and 3
C4: HSBC Centre Tower 1
C5: Florient Rise
D1: Cherry Street
D2: Lin Cheung Road
D3: Olympian City 2 and 3 
E: Bank of China Centre, Olympian City 1, The Long Beach, Hampton Place

References 

MTR stations in Kowloon
Tung Chung line
Tai Kok Tsui
Yau Tsim Mong District
Railway stations in Hong Kong opened in 1998